Aroostook County is a county in the U.S. state of Maine along the Canada–U.S. border. As of the 2020 census, the population was 67,105. Its county seat is Houlton, with offices in Caribou and Fort Kent.

Known locally in Maine as "The County", it is the largest county in Maine by total area, and the second largest in the United States by total area east of the Mississippi River, behind St. Louis County, Minnesota. It is Maine's northernmost county. Its northernmost village, Estcourt Station, is also the northernmost community in New England and in the contiguous United States east of the Great Lakes.

Aroostook County is known for its potato crops. The county is also an emerging hub for wind power. Its Acadian culture is also well-known. In the Saint John Valley in the northern part of the county, which borders Madawaska County, New Brunswick, many of the residents are bilingual in English and Acadian French, whereas elsewhere in Maine, New England French is the predominant form of French spoken.

History
The sparsely populated Maine North Woods, roughly defined as the headwaters of the Saint John, Penobscot and Kennebec Rivers, was populated through the colonial era by refugees fleeing unfriendly governments. Native Americans retreating from hostile European colonists, and smugglers trading with these Native Americans and between English Massachusetts and French Acadia lived in small communities along the Atlantic coast on the disputed border between those colonies. As England dominated the Gulf of Maine following the French and Indian Wars, these occupants of the border region retreated up the large rivers into the interior joined by Acadians escaping the Acadian Expulsion. Although the survivors might have preferred to remain independent, surrounding governments dividing their refuge perceived Aroostook County as the west bank of the Saint John River drainage upstream of Canada. Under United States control, the area was initially dominated by lumber manufacturing interests, although agriculture became important as population increased. Transportation along the Saint John River and early rail connections into New Brunswick caused strong business links with Canada until the county was connected to the United States rail network by the Bangor and Aroostook Railroad in 1894. Aroostook County residents retain an independent cultural identity established during their history of isolation on the border frontier.

Aroostook County was formed in 1839 from parts of Penobscot and Washington counties.  In 1843, Aroostook gained land from Penobscot County; in 1844, Aroostook again gained land from Penobscot, plus it exchanged land with Piscataquis County.  In 1889, Aroostook gained slightly from Penobscot, but gave back the land in 1903 when Aroostook County gained its final form.
Some of the territory in this county was part of the land dispute that led to the "Aroostook War" that would be settled by the Webster–Ashburton Treaty.

The county was also part of a route on the Underground Railroad, and was one of the last stops before entering Canada. Slaves would meet and hide just outside Aroostook or in deserted areas. Friends Quaker Church near Fort Fairfield was often a final stop.

Much of Aroostook County's economy was dominated by military spending through the Cold War. Limestone Army Air Field was built in Limestone, Maine in 1947. It was renamed Loring Air Force Base (AFB) in 1953 as the home of the Strategic Air Command (SAC) 42d Bombardment Wing operating Convair B-36 Peacemaker bombers. Aroostook County was chosen due to its strategic location as the closest point in the Continental United States to the Middle East and Europe including the Soviet Union west of the Ural Mountains. The 42d Bombardment Wing at Loring operated Boeing B-52 Stratofortress bombers until the 1991 Base Realignment and Closure Commission recommended closure and the base closed in 1994.

The 2014 Acadian World Congress was held along the Canada–United States border, co-hosted by Aroostook County and a number of neighboring counties in Canada (Témiscouata in Quebec, and Victoria, Madawaska and Restigouche in New Brunswick). Organizers planned a Tintamarre that was held in the town of Madawaska, Maine, as well as a giant tug of war across the Saint John River.

Geography
Aroostook County is Maine's largest county by area, about the size of Connecticut and Rhode Island combined. The county high point is Peaked Mountain, elevation , whose western slopes are in the north east corner of Piscataquis County.

Adjacent counties and municipalities
 Washington County, Maine – southeast
 Penobscot County, Maine – south
 Piscataquis County, Maine – south
 Somerset County, Maine – southwest
 Montmagny Regional County Municipality, Quebec – west
 L'Islet Regional County Municipality, Quebec – west
 Kamouraska Regional County Municipality, Quebec – northwest
 Témiscouata Regional County Municipality, Quebec – north
 Madawaska County, New Brunswick – northeast
 Victoria County, New Brunswick – east
 Carleton County, New Brunswick – east
 York County, New Brunswick – southeast

National protected area
 Aroostook National Wildlife Refuge
 Aroostook State Park

Major highways

Government and politics
Although the county is more socially conservative than Maine's southern and coastal counties, it was won by the Democratic Presidential candidate in the six elections from 1992 – 2012 before going for the Republican candidate in 2016. In the Maine Legislature, the county's delegation in 2013 included three Democrats and seven Republicans. In 2009 it voted 73% in favor of a referendum rejecting same-sex marriage and 54% against the Maine Medical Marijuana Act. In 2012, it voted 67% against a measure to legalize same-sex marriage in Maine, the highest opposition percentage of any county in the state. From 2016 to 2020, the margin increased from 55-38% to 59-39%, respectively. This makes Aroostook County the only county in New England to have a more major Republican shift.

Due to the remoteness from the rest of Maine and a perceived lack of connection with the Maine government, as well as a strong connection with neighboring Canada, politicians of Aroostook County, Maine, have proposed making Aroostook part of New Brunswick or spinning off the county as its own state, probably named Aroostook, since the 1990s. As recently as 2005 the question has been brought up before the state legislature.

Voter registration

Politics

|}

Demographics

2000 census
As of the census of 2000, there were 73,938 people, 30,356 households, and 20,429 families residing in the county.  The population density was 11 people per square mile (4/km2).  There were 38,719 housing units at an average density of 6 per square mile (2/km2).  The racial makeup of the county was 96.80% White, 0.38% Black or African American, 1.36% Native American, 0.47% Asian, 0.03% Pacific Islander, 0.17% from other races, and 0.80% from two or more races.  0.60% of the population were Hispanic or Latino of any race. 22.6% were of French, 15.4% United States or American, 14.6% English, 14.3% French Canadian and 10.2% Irish ancestry. As of 2010, 18.0% of the population reported speaking French at home; other than speakers of English, there were no other significant linguistic groups.

There were 30,356 households, out of which 28.40% had children under the age of 18 living with them, 55.60% were married couples living together, 8.10% had a female householder with no husband present, and 32.70% were non-families. 27.60% of all households were made up of individuals, and 13.10% had someone living alone who was 65 years of age or older.  The average household size was 2.36 and the average family size was 2.86.

In the county, the population was spread out, with 22.60% under the age of 18, 7.90% from 18 to 24, 26.30% from 25 to 44, 26.20% from 45 to 64, and 17.00% who were 65 years of age or older.  The median age was 41 years. For every 100 females there were 95.40 males.  For every 100 females age 18 and over, there were 92.70 males.

The median income for a household in the county was $28,837, and the median income for a family was $36,044. Males had a median income of $29,747 versus $20,300 for females. The per capita income for the county was $15,033.  About 9.80% of families and 14.30% of the population were below the poverty line, including 16.20% of those under age 18 and 16.00% of those age 65 or over.

2010 census
As of the 2010 United States Census, there were 71,870 people, 30,961 households, and 19,578 families residing in the county. The racial makeup of the county was 95.7% white, 1.7% Native American, 0.6% black or African American, 0.4% Asian, 0.2% from other races, and 1.4% from two or more races. Those of Hispanic or Latino origin made up 0.9% of the population. In terms of ancestry, 27.2% were French, 18.1% were English, 17.4% were Irish, 8.2% were French Canadian, 8.1% were American, and 5.2% were German.

Of the 30,961 households, 25.5% had children under the age of 18 living with them, 49.6% were married couples living together, 9.4% had a female householder with no husband present, 36.8% were non-families, and 30.8% of all households were made up of individuals. The average household size was 2.26 and the average family size was 2.79. The median age was 45.3 years.

The median income for a household in the county was $36,574 and the median income for a family was $47,114. Males had a median income of $37,222 versus $28,244 for females. The per capita income for the county was $20,251. About 10.6% of families and 15.4% of the population were below the poverty line, including 20.4% of those under age 18 and 11.7% of those age 65 or over.

Communities

Cities
 Caribou
 Presque Isle

Incorporated towns

 Allagash
 Amity
 Ashland
 Blaine
 Bridgewater
 Castle Hill
 Caswell
 Chapman
 Crystal
 Dyer Brook
 Eagle Lake
 Easton
 Fort Fairfield
 Fort Kent
 Frenchville
 Grand Isle
 Hamlin
 Hammond
 Haynesville
 Hersey
 Hodgdon
 Houlton
 Island Falls
 Limestone
 Linneus
 Littleton
 Ludlow
 Madawaska
 Mapleton
 Mars Hill
 Masardis
 Merrill
 Monticello
 New Canada
 New Limerick
 New Sweden
 Oakfield
 Orient
 Perham
 Portage Lake
 Saint Agatha
 Saint Francis
 Sherman
 Smyrna
 Stockholm
 Van Buren
 Wade
 Wallagrass
 Washburn
 Westfield
 Westmanland
 Weston
 Woodland

Plantations

 Cyr Plantation
 Garfield Plantation
 Glenwood Plantation
 Macwahoc Plantation
 Moro Plantation
 Nashville Plantation
 Reed Plantation
 Saint John Plantation
 Winterville Plantation

Census-designated places

 Ashland
 Blaine
 Eagle Lake
 Fort Fairfield
 Fort Kent
 Grand Isle
 Houlton
 Island Falls
 Limestone
 Madawaska
 Mapleton
 Mars Hill
 Oakfield
 Van Buren
 Washburn

Unincorporated communities within towns

 California
 Clayton Lake
 Crouseville
 Daigle
 Estcourt Station
 Fort Kent Mills
 Portage
 Saint David
 Sinclair
 Smyrna Mills
 Wytopitlock

Unorganized territories

 Cary
 Central Aroostook
 Connor
 Northwest Aroostook
 Oxbow
 Sinclair
 South Aroostook
 Square Lake

Indian reservations
 Aroostook Band of Mi'kmaq Indians Reservation, located in Presque Isle
 Houlton Band of Maliseet Indians Reservation, located in Houlton

See also
 National Register of Historic Places listings in Aroostook County, Maine

References

External links

 Aroostook County Government
 Aroostook County on Maine.gov
 Aroostook County events

 
1839 establishments in Maine
Maine placenames of Native American origin
Maine counties
Populated places established in 1839